Fitiuta, also known as Fiti'uta or Maia, is a village on the northeast coast of Taʻū island, one of the Manuʻa Islands in American Samoa. According to the 2000 United States census, Fitiuta had a population of 358, down from 454 in 1990. As of the 2010 United States Census, it had a population of 153. The village of Fitiuta is made up of two hamlets: Maia and Leusoali'i, the latter of which is the most eastern area on the island. Historically, they were classified as villages. The town has two shops, a hotel and a church, which was recently built.  Fitiuta Airport is located in the town.

The area is famed for its myths and legends. According to Samoan mythology, it was in a place called Saua in Fitiuta that the god Tagaloa decided to make the first human being and crown the first human king, the Tuimanu'a. It was also near this village that the first kava ceremony was performed.

Etymology
According to legends, the village was originally known as Aga'e. The village was home to the first Samoan chief, Tagaloa Ui, in ancient times. He was a mortal descendant from the gods and his daughter, Sina, was known all over the Samoan Islands for her beauty.  Tuifiti, the king of Fiji, traveled to Samoa and proposed to Sina. After some time in Fiji, Sina became lonely and the chief's eldest son, Taeotagaloa, traveled to Fiji in order to bring her home. The king was sad to see Queen Sina leave and made a request for her to rename her village “Fitiuta”, which means “Fiji in the Mountains.”

Geography
The village is located on the northeast coast of Ta‘ū Island. Fitiuta is one of three villages on Ta'ū Island. On both sides of the village are steep slopes with agricultural lands on their summits, owned by Fitiuta families and certain areas communally owned by Fitiuta village. A number of fruits are grown here, including breadfruit, banana, coconut, and some taro. The village of Fitiuta is made up of two hamlets: Maia and Leusoali'i. The two Fitiuta hamlets share the same schoolhouse, dispensary building, and church.

It is directly north of the National Park of American Samoa.

The climate is described as "a warm, tropical island surrounded by the South Pacific Ocean with temperatures moderated by southeast trade winds. It has humid days and nights and rainfall is abundant."

Notable people
 Galea'i Peni Poumele, former Lieutenant Governor of American Samoa

References

External links
 National Park Service map of the Manu‘a Islands showing location of Fiti‘uta on the island of Ta‘ū.

Populated places in American Samoa